Helen Hooker or Helen Hooker O'Malley Roelefs (1 January 1905 – 2 April 1993) was an American sculptor and portrait painter who spent a considerable part of her career in Ireland.

Early life
Helen Hooker was born in Greenwich, Connecticut, United States on 1 January 1905. She was the third of four daughters of chemical engineer and business man Elon Huntington Hooker, and Blanche (née) Ferry, the daughter of Dexter M. Ferry. The family were wealthy and had six governors of Connecticut and Massachusetts among their fore bearers. Hooker attended Miss Chapin's School in New York until 1923, and in the same year won the American national junior tennis championship, rating tenth on the tennis tables. She was artistic from an early age, making her first sculpture, of a rabbit, aged six. Instead of attending university, Hooker studied sculpture with Mahonri Young, William Zorach, and Edmond Amateis in New York, and later in Paris at Académie de la Grande Chaumière with Antoine Bourdelle. Hooker was well travelled, studying wood carving in Germany, sculpture and dance in Greece, theatre design in Moscow, and painting in Leningrad, where she learned from the Russian avant-garde painter Pavel Filonov.

Time in Ireland
In 1933, Hooker met and fell in love with the Irish writer Ernie O'Malley, who her family did not approve of. Despite that, the couple married on 27 September 1935 at Marylebone registry office, London. The couple first moved to 229 Upper Rathmines Road, Dublin, and later relocated to County Mayo in the autumn of 1937. With financial assistance from Hooker's father, the couple rented and then bought Burrishoole Lodge, near Newport, County Mayo, with forty acres in Hooker's name. She bought an additional 30 acres in 1942, which the family worked as a farm. They amassed an extensive art collection, which included works by Jack Butler Yeats, Evie Hone, Mainie Jellett, Paul Henry, Nano Reid, John Piper, Henry Moore, Amedeo Modigliani, and Georges Rouault. The couple had three children, Cathal, Etáin, and Cormac. By 1944, their marriage was failing, leading to Hooker requesting a divorce in late 1946 in the United States. They finally separated, and were divorced in 1952, and Hooker abducted two of the eldest children to Colorado Springs, Colorado without O'Malley's consent. Their youngest remained with O'Malley in Ireland.

Hooker continued to be a generous patron of the arts in Ireland. She donated a collection of 434 photographic prints to the National Library of Ireland. The photographs were taken by Hooker and O'Malley, and featured ancient monastic sites, scenic views, and candid portrait photographs. Hooker established the O'Malley collection of paintings by other artists in collaboration with the Irish American Cultural Institution. Part of this collection is on permanent loan to the Irish Museum of Modern Art, and the other half with the Mayo County Council. She originally wished a museum would be built in Mayo to house the collection, but this did not come to fruition.

Artistic work
After returning to Connecticut in 1930, she held an exhibition of her watercolours at the Darien art guild, and a further show at the national art club in New York in 1933. Hooker exhibited her first work in Ireland in 1943, Island woman, at the Irish Exhibition of Living Art, and A portrait of Mrs Kiernan at the Royal Hibernian Academy (RHA). She showed seven more pieces at the Living Art exhibitions between 1944 and 1948. Hooker built a studio at Burrishoole in December 1943, but bought and moved into a house at 15 Whitebeam Avenue, Clonskeagh, Dublin in autumn 1944. From Clonskeagh, she began work with the Players' Theatre, Dublin, doing theatre design. Following the breakdown of her marriage, Hooker split her time between Connecticut and Dublin. She held her first solo show in St Stephen's Green Gallery in 1950, which featured busts of Liam O'Flaherty and Denis Johnston. The Dublin Magazine commented that Hooker was "in the academic tradition as a sculptor. She models well and surely; and in her straight portraiture shows excellent feeling for character. She is not so successful when she attempts to simplify or formalise which, admittedly, she does rarely."

After her return to Connecticut, she held her first exhibition of sculpture at the Taylor Museum, Colorado. Hooker spent six months of every year in Ireland from 1960, writing that "I have made my name as an artist in Dublin . . . My best years I gave to Ireland with all my heart and my soul." She modeled numerous famous Irish figures, such as Mary Lavin, Eavan Boland, Austin Clarke, Dana Rosemary Scallon, and Éamon de Valera. De Valera did not sit for Hooker, instead they had tea together for 20 minutes, after which Hooker retired to a Dublin hotel and reportedly worked for 36 hours, modeling from memory. She exhibited a portrait of Patrick Carey with the RHA in 1974, but she generally exhibited more in the States than in Ireland. A 1973 retrospective of her work was held at Fairfield Court, Greenwich, Connecticut and was sponsored by the American Irish Historical Society. In 1980, 18 of her works cast in polyester from plaster originals were featured at the Birmingham Museum of Art, Alabama. The Ferguson Library, Stamford, hosted an exhibition of 21 of Hooker's portraits in 1985, including a portraits of Seamus Heaney, Samuel Beckett, James Galway, and Seán O'Casey.

Later life
Hooker married Richard Roelefs in 1956, and settled in Connecticut. She was widowed in 1971. Hooker died on 2 April 1993, in Greenwich. The University of Limerick officially inaugurated the Helen Hooker O'Malley Roelefs Sculpture Trust in September 1993. The trust includes all 41 heads and figures of her Irish portraits. The University of Limerick now hold a permanent exhibition of the O'Malley Collection since 2004.

References

Further reading
O’Malley, Cormac and Barron, Juliet Christy, (2015) Western Ways: Remembering Mayo Through the Eyes of Helen Hooker and Ernie O’Malley, Mercier Press.

External links
The Helen Hooker O'Malley Roelefs Sculpture Trust

1905 births
1993 deaths
Sculptors from Connecticut
American women sculptors
Artists from Connecticut
20th-century American women artists
20th-century American sculptors
American female tennis players
American expatriates in Ireland